Jacques Fonteray (10 February 1918 – 6 January 2013) was a French costume designer active in the film industry. Amongst his credits were the costumes for the 1968 film Barbarella.

Selected filmography
 Inferno (L'enfer)by H.G.Clouzot, with Romy Schneider (1964)
 Marco the Magnificent (La Fabuleuse Aventure de Marco Polo) by Denys de La Patellière (1965)
"Rapture" by John Guillermin (1965)
 "Is Paris burning ?" ( Paris brûle-t-il ? by René Clément with Kirk Douglas (1966)
 "King of Hearts" (Le Roi de Coeur) by Philippe de Broca with Alan Bates (1966)
 I Killed Rasputin (J'ai tué Raspoutine)by Robert Hossein (1967) with Geraldine Chaplin (1967)
 Darling Caroline (1968)
 Castle Keep(Un château en enfer) by Sydney Pollack(1969) with Burt Lancaster
 Borsalino by Jacques Deray (1970)
 Delusions of Grandeur (La Folie des Grandeurs) by Gerard Oury (1971)with Yves Montand & Louis de Funès (1971)
 Rum Runners(Boulevard du Rhum, by Robert Enrico (1971) with Brigitte Bardot
 Barbe Bleue by Edward Dmytryk (1972)with Raquel Welch & Richard Burton
 "Story of a Love Story" (L’Impossible Objet), by John Frankenheimer, with Alan Bates (1973)
  "French Connection 2", by John Frankenheimer, with Gene Hackman (1975)
 James Bond and Moonraker by Lewis Gilbert with Roger Moore (1979)
 " 1001 Nights" (Les Mille et Une Nuits) by Philippe de Broca, with Catherine Zeta-Jones (1989)

References

Bibliography 
 Amber Butchart. The Fashion of Film: How Cinema has Inspired Fashion. Hachette, 2016.
 Elizabeth Castaldo Lundèn : "Barbarella's Wardrobe exploring Jacques Fonteray's Intergalactic Runway " in Film Fashion and Consumption (vol.5 (2) page 185-211. Décembre 2016
 Working documents and sketches at the Margaret Herrick Library. Academy of Motion Picture Arts & Sciences (Los Angeles)
200 sketches & working documents. La Cinémathèque Française (Paris)

External links 
 

1918 births
2013 deaths
French costume designers
Artists from Grenoble